Derek Lalonde (born August 18, 1972) is an American ice hockey coach who is the head coach of the Detroit Red Wings of the National Hockey League (NHL).

Playing career
Lalonde played college hockey for Cortland State as a goaltender from 1991 to 1994.  He graduated with a bachelor's degree in physical education, and later earned a Master of Arts in education administration from the Massachusetts College of Liberal Arts.

Coaching career
Lalonde's coaching career began as a graduate assistant at Massachusetts College of Liberal Arts from 1995 to 1997.  In 1998, Lalonde began a 2-year stint as an assistant coach at Lebanon Valley College, followed by two seasons as an assistant at Hamilton College.

Lalonde's assistant coaching stints continued at Ferris State University from 2002 to 2006, and the University of Denver from 2006 to 2011. He began his head coaching for the Green Bay Gamblers of the United States Hockey League (USHL) from 2011 to 2014, where he accumulated a record of 114–56–8–6. He was named the USHL's Coach of the Year in 2012 after the Gamblers posted a 47–9–2–2 record and won the Gamblers' fourth Clark Cup title. In 2013, Lalonde served as a coach at the Tampa Bay Lightning development camp.

He then served as the head coach of the Toledo Walleye of the ECHL from 2014 to 2016. He led the Walleye to a 97–35–7–5 record and two consecutive Brabham Cup titles as the ECHL's regular-season champion. In his first season in 2014, he led the Walleye to a 50–15–5–2 record and won the John Brophy Award as the ECHL's Coach of the Year. He then served as the head coach of the Iowa Wild of the American Hockey League (AHL) from 2016 to 2018, where he posted a 69–58–17–8 record. He served as an assistant coach for the Tampa Bay Lightning of the National Hockey League (NHL) from 2018 to 2022, helping lead the team to consecutive Stanley Cup titles in 2020 and 2021.

On June 30, 2022, he was named the head coach of the Detroit Red Wings of the NHL.

Awards and championships
 John Brophy Award (ECHL Coach of the Year): 2014-15
 USHL Coach of the Year: 2011-12
 Clark Cup (USHL Champion): 2012
 Stanley Cup Champion: 2020, 2021

References

Living people
1972 births
Detroit Red Wings coaches
Cortland Red Dragons athletes